Dener Assunção Braz (28 June 1991 – 28 November 2016), simply known as Dener, was a Brazilian footballer who last played as a left back for Chapecoense.

Dener was one of the victims when LaMia Airlines Flight 2933 crashed on 28 November 2016.

Club career
Born in Bagé, Rio Grande do Sul, Dener finished his youth formation with Grêmio. He made his first team debut on 20 January 2011, coming on as a substitute in a 1–1 Campeonato Gaúcho away draw against Ypiranga.

After loan stints at Veranópolis, Vitória and Caxias, Dener signed a permanent one-year deal with Ituano on 13 January 2014. An undisputed starter, he only missed one match in the club's Campeonato Paulista winning campaign.

On 17 April 2014, Dener joined Coritiba. He made his Série A debut on 11 May, replacing Carlinhos in a 0–1 home loss against Sport Club do Recife, and scored his first professional goal late in the month in a 3–0 home win against Goiás.

On 23 December 2014, Dener was loaned to fellow top tier club Chapecoense. An ever-present figure during the season, he signed a permanent three-year contract with the club on 13 January 2016.

Death
On 28 November 2016, whilst at the service of Chapecoense, Dener was among the fatalities of the LaMia Airlines Flight 2933 accident in the Colombian village of Cerro Gordo, La Unión, Antioquia.

Career statistics

Honours
Ituano
Campeonato Paulista: 2014

Chapecoense
Campeonato Catarinense: 2016
 Copa Sudamericana: 2016 (posthumously)

References

External links

1991 births
2016 deaths
People from Bagé
Brazilian footballers
Association football defenders
Campeonato Brasileiro Série A players
Campeonato Brasileiro Série B players
Campeonato Brasileiro Série C players
Campeonato Brasileiro Série D players
Grêmio Foot-Ball Porto Alegrense players
Esporte Clube Vitória players
Sociedade Esportiva e Recreativa Caxias do Sul players
Ituano FC players
Coritiba Foot Ball Club players
Associação Chapecoense de Futebol players
Footballers killed in the LaMia Flight 2933 crash
Sportspeople from Rio Grande do Sul